Ain Zebdeh, is a village located in the Western Beqaa District of the Beqaa Governorate in Lebanon.

History
In 1838, Eli Smith noted  it as 'Ain Zibdeh; a village on the West side of the Beqaa Valley.

References

Bibliography

External links
Ain Zebdeh, localiban

Populated places in Western Beqaa District